Masarna are a Swedish motorcycle speedway team based in Avesta, Sweden. They last rode in the Elitserien during the 2022 Swedish Speedway season but are currently not racing due to financial problems. They are two times champions of Sweden.

History
The club was founded in 1937 as the Folkare Motorklubb but their first track was not built until 1948. Masarna joined the Swedish second division in 1958 (which was known as the Allsvenskan from 1982) and remained there until gaining promotion to the Elitserien in 1999. They then won their first Elitserien championship in 2000.

Masarna continued to compete in the highest division until they were relegated in 2008 to the Allsvenskan, after finishing bottom of the Elitserien table although they had already announced their intention to drop a division for the 2009 season.

They later returned to the Elitserien. The team won a second Swedish title in 2020 despite finishing fifth in the regular season table; the team peaked at the right time and went on to defeat Indianerna in the final.

Despite the success experienced in 2020 and 2022 the club withdrew from the league for the 2023 season due to financial problems.

Season summary

Teams
Currently not competing

Previous teams

2014 team

 
 
 
 
 
 
 

2020 team (champions)

 
 
 
 
 
 
 
 
 
 
 

2021 team
 
 
 
 
 
 
 
 
 

2022 team
 Manager Sebastian Aldén & Anton Rosén

References

Swedish speedway teams
Sport in Avesta